Marquess of San Isidro was a hereditary title in the Peerage of Spain, granted in 1730 by Philip V to Pablo Rui-Gómez, Viscount of Benafarces, knight of the Order of Santiago and perpetual regidor of León. The title was granted in recognition of his contribution to the restoration of the Basilica of San Isidoro in Leon, Spain.

The baroque palace of the Marquesses of San Isidro was, before a heavy fire in 1942, located at an emblematic spot where the Spanish troops first rebelled against Napoleon in León. There is also an avenue in the same city, named after the third Marquess of San Isidro, Santos Rui-Gómez, who perished in battle fighting for Spain's independence from the French in 1813.

As of 2010, the title is extinct, as more than 40 years have elapsed since the death of the last holder (1885).

Viscounts of Benafarces (1729)

 Pablo Rui-Gómez Lasso de la Vega y Balmaseda, 1st Viscount of Benafarces (d. 1742)

Marquesses of San Isidro (1730)
 Pablo Rui-Gómez Lasso de la Vega y Balmaseda, 1st Marquess of San Isidro (d. 1742)
 Juan Francisco Rui-Gómez y Bustamante, 2nd Marquess of San Isidro (1726-1787), only son of the 1st Marquess
 Santos Rui-Gómez y de Prado, 3rd Marquess of San Isidro (1750-1813), eldest son of the 2nd Marquess
 Francisco de Paula Rui-Gómez y de Prado, 4th Marquess of San Isidro (d. 1826), second son of the 2nd Marquess
 Francisco Manuel Rui-Gómez y Dañobeitia, 5th Marquess of San Isidro (1806-1885), only son of the 4th Marquess

See also
Basílica de San Isidoro, León
Spanish nobility

References

External links

 Genealogical information on the Marquesses of San Isidro

Marquessates in the Spanish nobility
Noble titles created in 1730
Spanish noble titles